Dolf Jansen (born 25 June 1963 in Amsterdam) is a Dutch comedian, host of the Radio 2 programme Spijkers met Koppen and an active Marathon runner. On television Jansen hosted Loods 6 (1991), Kunstbende (1992), Jansen slaat door (TROS) (1993) and Jansen op jacht (2007).
He performed together with Hans Sibbel as the comedy team 'Lebbis en Jansen', but also performs as an individual comedian.
He also is an ambassador of Oxfam Novib.

Dolf Jansen has an Irish mother.

Solo programmes
2002: Dolf Solo
2004: Jansen Praat
2005: Dolfdurft
2007: Geen Oudejaarsvoorstelling
2008: Echt (Oudejaars 2008)
2009: Altijd Verder
2010: Oudejaars 2010
2011: Als ik het niet doe doet niemand het
2011: Oudejaars van de straat (In Pauw & Witteman)
2012: Als ik het niet doe doet niemand het (en daar zal ook wel weer een reden voor zijn*) * maar mij wordt weer eens niets verteld

See also
 Radio 2

References

External links
  Jansen's website 
 Jansen's Twitter

1963 births
Living people
Dutch cabaret performers
Dutch male comedians
Dutch male marathon runners
Dutch people of Irish descent
Dutch radio personalities
Mass media people from Amsterdam